Paul Edward Nauert (born July 7, 1963) is an American retired Major League Baseball umpire. He worked in the National League from 1995 to 1999 and in Major League Baseball from 2002 until his retirement in 2022. Nauert worked the World Series in 2017.

Nauert previously worked in the Appalachian League (1988), the Midwest League (1989–1990), the Florida Instructional League (1988–1990), the Southern League (1991–1992), and the International League (1993–1998). He was the base umpire during the 27-inning, eight-hour-and-15-minute, Bluefield at Burlington game of June 24, 1988, that ended at 3:27 am on June 25.

Nauert umpired his first National League game on May 19, 1995, and was one of 22 umpires whose resignations were accepted in 1999 (the resignations were part of a failed union negotiating strategy). On being rehired in 2002, he became part of the Major League Baseball umpire staff. Nauert has worked the 2020 American League Wild Card Series, the 2004 American League Division Series, the 2008 National League Division Series, the 2010 National League Division Series, the 2013 National League Division Series, the 2014 American League Division Series, the 2016 National League Championship Series, and the 2017 National League Division Series. He was a part of the crew that worked both the  MLB China Series (the first MLB games ever played in China) and the 2008 Japan Opening Series. Nauert also worked the 2009 Major League Baseball All-Star Game.

See also

 List of Major League Baseball umpires

References

External links
Career umpiring information from MLB, or The Baseball Cube, or Retrosheet

1963 births
Living people
Sportspeople from Louisville, Kentucky
Major League Baseball umpires